{{DISPLAYTITLE:f(R) gravity}}
() is a type of modified gravity theory which generalizes Einstein's general relativity. gravity is actually a family of theories, each one defined by a different function, of the Ricci scalar, . The simplest case is just the function being equal to the scalar; this is general relativity. As a consequence of introducing an arbitrary function, there may be freedom to explain the accelerated expansion and structure formation of the Universe without adding unknown forms of dark energy or dark matter. It has become an active field of research following work by Starobinsky on cosmic inflation. A wide range of phenomena can be produced from this theory by adopting different functions; however, many functional forms can now be ruled out on observational grounds, or because of pathological theoretical problems.

Introduction

In gravity, one seeks to generalize the Lagrangian of the Einstein–Hilbert action:

to

The first is to use metric formalism and the second is to use the Palatini formalism. While the two formalisms lead to the same field equations for General Relativity, i.e., when , the field equations may differ when .

Metric gravity

Derivation of field equations
In metric gravity, one arrives at the field equations by varying the action with respect to the metric and not treating the connection  independently. For completeness we will now briefly mention the basic steps of the variation of the action. The main steps are the same as in the case of the variation of the Einstein–Hilbert action (see the article for more details) but there are also some important differences.

The variation of the determinant is as always:

The Ricci scalar is defined as

Therefore, its variation with respect to the inverse metric  is given by

For the second step see the article about the Einstein–Hilbert action. Since is the difference of two connections, it should transform as a tensor. Therefore, it can be written as 

Substituting into the equation above:

Denoting , the variation in the action reads:

Doing integration by parts on the second and third terms (and neglected the boundary contributions), we get:

By demanding that the action remains invariant under variations of the metric, one obtains the field equations:

where is the energy–momentum tensor defined as

where is the matter Lagrangian.

The generalized Friedmann equations 
Assuming a Robertson–Walker metric with scale factor  we can find the generalized Friedmann equations to be (in units where ):

where
 is the Hubble parameter, 
the dot is the derivative with respect to the cosmic time , and the terms m and rad represent the matter and radiation densities respectively; these satisfy the continuity equations:

Modified Newton's constant
An interesting feature of these theories is the fact that the gravitational constant is time and scale dependent. To see this, add a small scalar perturbation to the metric (in the Newtonian gauge):

After some lengthy calculations, one can define a Poisson equation in the Fourier space and attribute the extra terms that appear on the right hand side to an effective gravitational constant eff. Doing so, we get the gravitational potential (valid on sub-horizon scales ):

where m is a perturbation in the matter density,  is the Fourier scale and eff is:

with

Massive gravitational waves 

This class of theories when linearized exhibits three polarization modes for the gravitational waves, of which two correspond to the massless graviton (helicities ±2) and the third (scalar) is coming from the fact that if we take into account a conformal transformation, the fourth order theory becomes general relativity plus a scalar field. To see this, identify

and use the field equations above to get

Working to first order of perturbation theory:

and after some tedious algebra, one can solve for the metric perturbation, which corresponds to the gravitational waves. A particular frequency component, for a wave propagating in the -direction, may be written as

where

and g() = d/d is the group velocity of a wave packet  centred on wave-vector . The first two terms correspond to the usual transverse polarizations from general relativity, while the third corresponds to the new massive polarization mode of  theories. This mode is a mixture of massless transverse breathing mode (but not traceless) and massive longitudinal scalar mode.    The transverse and traceless modes (also known as tensor modes) propagate at the speed of light, but the massive scalar mode moves at a speed G < 1 (in units where  = 1), this mode is dispersive. However, in  gravity metric formalism, for the model  (also known as pure  model), the third polarization mode is a pure breathing mode and propagate with the speed of light through the spacetime.

Equivalent formalism 

Under certain additional conditions we can simplify the analysis of  theories by introducing an auxiliary field . Then, one obtains the O'Hanlon (1972) action:

We have the Euler–Lagrange equations

Eliminating , we obtain exactly the same equations as before. However, the equations are only second order in the derivatives, instead of fourth order.

We are currently working with the Jordan frame. By performing a conformal rescaling

we transform to the Einstein frame:

after integrating by parts.

Defining , and substituting

This is general relativity coupled to a real scalar field: using theories to describe the accelerating universe is practically equivalent to using quintessence. (At least, equivalent up to the caveat that we have not yet specified matter couplings, so (for example) gravity in which matter is minimally coupled to the metric (i.e., in Jordan frame) is equivalent to a quintessence theory in which the scalar field mediates a fifth force with gravitational strength.)

Palatini gravity

In Palatini gravity, one treats the metric and connection independently and varies the action with respect to each of them separately. The matter Lagrangian is assumed to be independent of the connection. Due to the structure of the theory, however, Palatini theories appear to be in conflict with the Standard Model, may violate Solar system experiments, and seem to create unwanted singularities.

Metric-affine gravity

In metric-affine gravity, one generalizes things even further, treating both the metric and connection independently, and assuming the matter Lagrangian depends on the connection as well.

Observational tests

As there are many potential forms of  gravity, it is difficult to find generic tests. Additionally, since deviations away from General Relativity can be made arbitrarily small in some cases, it is impossible to conclusively exclude some modifications. Some progress can be made, without assuming a concrete form for the function by Taylor expanding

The first term is like the cosmological constant and must be small. The next coefficient 1 can be set to one as in general relativity. For metric gravity (as opposed to Palatini or metric-affine gravity), the quadratic term is best constrained by fifth force measurements, since it leads to a Yukawa correction to the gravitational potential.

The parameterized post-Newtonian formalism is designed to be able to constrain generic modified theories of gravity. However, gravity shares many of the same values as General Relativity, and is therefore indistinguishable using these tests. In particular light deflection is unchanged, so gravity, like General Relativity, is entirely consistent with the bounds from Cassini tracking.

Starobinsky gravity

Starobinsky gravity has the following form

where  has the dimensions of mass.

Starobinsky gravity provides a mechanism for the cosmic inflation, just after the Big Bang when  was still large. However, it is not suited to describe the present universe acceleration since at present  is very small.

Gogoi-Goswami gravity
Gogoi-Goswami gravity has the following form

Tensorial generalization 

() gravity as presented in the previous sections is a scalar modification of general relativity. More generally, we can have a 

coupling involving invariants of the Ricci tensor and the Weyl tensor. Special cases are  gravity, conformal gravity, Gauss–Bonnet gravity and Lovelock gravity. Notice that with any nontrivial tensorial dependence, we typically have additional massive spin-2 degrees of freedom, in addition to the massless graviton and a massive scalar. An exception is Gauss–Bonnet gravity where the fourth order terms for the spin-2 components cancel out.

See also 

 Extended theories of gravity
 Gauss–Bonnet gravity
 Lovelock gravity

References

Further reading
 See Chapter 29 in the textbook on "Particles and Quantum Fields" by Kleinert, H. (2016), World Scientific (Singapore, 2016) (also available online)

Salvatore Capozziello and Mariafelicia De Laurentis, (2015) "F(R) theories of gravitation". Scholarpedia, doi:10.4249/scholarpedia.31422
Kalvakota, Vaibhav R., (2021) "Investigating f(R)" gravity and cosmologies". Mathematical physics preprint archive, https://web.ma.utexas.edu/mp_arc/c/21/21-38.pdf

External links
f(R) gravity on arxiv.org
Extended Theories of Gravity

Theories of gravity